Iambrix is an Indomalayan genus of grass skippers in the family Hesperiidae.

References
Natural History Museum Lepidoptera genus database

Ancistroidini
Butterflies of Indochina
Hesperiidae genera